Semyonovsky Uyezd (Семёновский уезд) was one of the subdivisions of the Nizhny Novgorod Governorate of the Russian Empire. It was situated in the northern part of the governorate. Its administrative centre was Semyonov.

Demographics
At the time of the Russian Empire Census of 1897, Semyonovsky Uyezd had a population of 111,388. Of these, 99.9% spoke Russian as their native language.

References

 
Uezds of Nizhny Novgorod Governorate
Nizhny Novgorod Governorate